Lageråa is a small river in Innlandet county, Norway. For a time, the river forms the border between Hamar and Løten municipalities. When the river reaches the village of Ilseng in Stange, it discharges into the larger river Svartelva.

See also
List of rivers in Norway

References

Hamar
Stange
Rivers of Innlandet